Joaquín Baranda (May 7, 1840, Mérida, Yucatán – May 21, 1909, Mexico City) was a Mexican politician, lawyer and jurist. He played a main role in the creation of institutions like the Ministry of Justice and the Escuela Normal para Profesores. During his political career he served in the Chamber of Deputies and as president of the Supreme Tribunal of Justice, also as governor of Campeche from 1871 to 1877. His remains were interred at the Panteón de Dolores, in Mexico City, in the Rotunda of Illustrious Persons on June 29, 1981.

References

External links
 

1840 births
1909 deaths
Members of the Chamber of Deputies (Mexico)
Mexican judges